Dental trauma refers to trauma (injury) to the teeth and/or periodontium (gums, periodontal ligament, alveolar bone), and nearby soft tissues such as the lips, tongue, etc. The study of dental trauma is called dental traumatology.

Types

Dental injuries
Dental injuries include:
 Enamel infraction
 Enamel fracture
 Enamel-dentine fracture
 Enamel-dentine fracture involving pulp exposure
 Root fracture of tooth

Periodontal injuries 
 Concussion (bruising)
Subluxation of the tooth (tooth knocked loose)
Luxation of the tooth (displaced)
Extrusive
Intrusive
Lateral 
 Avulsion of the tooth (tooth knocked out)

Injuries to supporting bone 

This injury involves the alveolar bone and may extend beyond the alveolus. There are five different types of alveolar fractures: 
 Communicated fracture of the socket wall 
 Fracture of the socket wall
 Dentoalveolar fracture (segmental) 
 Fracture of the maxilla : Le Fort fracture, zygomatic fracture, orbital blowout
 Fracture of the mandible 
Trauma injuries involving the alveolus can be complicated as it does not happen in isolation, very often presents along with other types of tooth tissue injuries.

Signs of dentoalveolar fracture: 
 Change to occlusion
 Multiple teeth moving together as a segment and are normally displaced 
 Bruising of attached gingivae 
 Gingivae across the fracture line often lacerated
Investigation: Require more than one radiographic view to identify the fracture line.

Treatment: Reposition displaced teeth under local anaesthetic and stabilise the mobile segment with a splint for 4 weeks, suture any soft tissue lacerations.

Soft tissue laceration 

Soft tissues injuries are presented commonly in association with dental trauma. Areas normally affected are lips, buccal mucosa, gingivae, frenum and tongue. The most common injuries are lips and gingivae. For lips, important to rule out presence of foreign objects in wounds and lacerations through careful examination. A radiograph can be taken to identify any potential foreign objects.

Gingivae lacerations that are small normally heals spontaneously and do not require any intervention. However, this can be one of the clinical presentation of an alveolar fracture. Gingivae bleeding especially around the margins may suggest injury to the periodontal ligament of the tooth.

The facial nerve and parotid duct should be examined for any potential damage when the buccal mucosa is involved.

Deep tissue wounds should be repaired in layers with sutures that are resorbable.

Primary teeth
Trauma to primary teeth occurs most commonly at the age of two to three years, during the development of motor coordination. When primary teeth are injured, the resulting treatment prioritises the safety of the adult tooth, and should avoid any risk of damaging the permanent successors. This is because the root apex of an injured primary tooth lies near the tooth germ of the adult tooth.

Therefore, a displaced primary tooth will be removed if it is found to have encroached upon the developing adult tooth germ. If this happens, parents should be advised of possible complications such as enamel hypoplasia, hypocalcification, crown/root dilaceration, or disruptions in tooth eruption sequence.

Potential sequelae can involve pulpal necrosis, pulp obliteration and root resorption. Necrosis is the most common complication and an assessment is generally made based on the colour supplemented with radiograph monitoring. A change in colour may mean that the tooth is still vital but if this persists it is likely to be non-vital.

Permanent teeth

Dental Injuries

Periodontal Injuries

Risk factors 

Age, especially young children
Primary dentition stage (2–3 years old, when children's motor function is developing and start learning how to walk/ run) 
Mixed dentition stage (8–10 years old)
Permanent dentition stage (13–15 years old)
Male > Female 
Season (Many trauma incidents occur more in summer compared to winter)
Sports, especially contact sports such as football, hockey, rugby, basketball and skating 
Piercing in tongue and lips
Military training
Acute changes in the barometric pressure, i.e. dental barotrauma, which can affect scuba divers and aviators
Class II malocclusion with increased overjet and Class II skeletal relationship  and incompetent lips are the significant risk factors

Prevention 
Prevention in general is relatively difficult as it is nearly impossible to stop accidents from happening, especially in children who are quite active. Regular use of a gum shield during sports and other high-risk activities (such as military training) is the most effective prevention for dental trauma. They are mainly being fitted on the upper teeth as it has higher risk of dental trauma compared to the lower teeth. Gum shields ideally have to be comfortable for users, retentive, odourless, tasteless and the materials should not be causing any harm to the body. However, studies in various high-risk populations for dental injuries have repeatedly reported low compliance of individuals for the regular using of mouthguard during activities. Moreover, even with regular use, effectiveness of prevention of dental injuries is not complete, and injuries can still occur even when mouthguards are used as users are not always aware of the best makes or size, which inevitably result in a poor fit.

Types of gum shield

 Stock ready-moulded
 Not recommended as it does not conform the teeth at all 
 Poor retention
 Poor fit 
 Higher risk of dislodging during contact sports and airway occlusion which may lead to respiratory distress
 Self-moulded/ Boil and bite 
 Limited range of sizes, which may result in poor fitting
 Can be easily remoulded if distorted 
 Cheap
Custom-made
 Made with ethylene vinyl acetate 
 The most ideal type of gum shield 
 Good retention
 Able to build in multiple layers/laminations
 Expensive

One of the most important measures is to impart knowledge and awareness about dental injury to those who are involved in sports environments like boxing and in school children in which they are at high risk of suffering dental trauma through an extensive educational campaign including lectures, leaflets, posters which should be presented in an easy understandable way.

Management 

The management depends on the type of injury involved and whether it is a baby or an adult tooth. If teeth are completely knocked out baby front teeth should not be replaced.  The area should be cleaned gently and the child brought to see a dentist. Adult front teeth (which usually erupt at around six years of age) can be replaced immediately if clean.  See below and the Dental Trauma Guide website for more details. If a tooth is avulsed, make sure it is a permanent tooth (primary teeth should not be replanted, and instead the injury site should be cleaned to allow the adult tooth to begin to erupt).

   Reassure the patient and keep them calm.
   If the tooth can be found, pick it up by the crown (the white part). Avoid touching the root part.
   If the tooth is dirty, wash it briefly (ten seconds) under cold running water but do not scrub the tooth.
   Place the tooth back in the socket where it was lost from, taking care to place it the correct way (matching the other tooth)
   Encourage the patient to bite on a handkerchief to hold the tooth in position.
 If it is not possible to replace the tooth immediately, ideally, the tooth should be placed in Hank's balanced salt solution, if not available, in a glass of milk or a container with the patient's saliva or in the patient's cheek (keeping it between the teeth and the inside of the cheek – note this is not suitable for young children who may swallow the tooth). Transporting the tooth in water is not recommended, as this will damage the delicate cells that make up the tooth's interior.
Seek emergency dental treatment immediately.

When the injured teeth are painful while functioning due to damage to the periodontal ligaments (e.g., dental subluxation), a temporary splinting of the injured teeth may relieve the pain and enhance eating ability. Splinting should only be used in certain situations. Splinting in lateral and extrusive luxation had a poorer prognosis than in root fractures. An avulsed permanent tooth should be gently rinsed under tap water and immediately re-planted in its original socket within the alveolar bone and later temporarily splinted by a dentist. Failure to re-plant the avulsed tooth within the first 40 minutes after the injury may result in very poor prognosis for the tooth. Management of injured primary teeth differs from management of permanent teeth; an avulsed primary tooth should not be re-planted (to avoid damage to the permanent dental crypt). This is due to the close proximity of the apex of a primary tooth to the permanent tooth underneath. The permanent dentition can suffer from tooth malformation, impacted teeth and eruption disturbances due to trauma to primary teeth. The priority should always be reducing potential damage to the underlying permanent dentition.

For other injuries, it is important to keep the area clean by using a soft toothbrush and antiseptic mouthwash such as chlorhexidine gluconate. Soft foods and avoidance of contact sports is also recommended in the short term.  Dental care should be sought as quickly as possible.

Splinting 
A tooth that has experienced trauma may become loose due to the periodontal ligament becoming damaged or fracture to the root of the tooth. Splinting ensures that the tooth is held in the correct position within the socket, ensuring that no further trauma occurs to enable healing. A splint can either be flexible or rigid. Flexible splints do not completely immobilise the traumatised tooth and still allow for functional movement. Contrastingly, rigid splints completely immobilise the traumatised tooth. The International Association of Dental Traumatology (IADT) guidelines recommend the use of flexible, non-rigid splints for a short duration by stating that both periodontal and pulpal healing is encouraged if the traumatised tooth is allowed slight movement and if the splinting time is not too long.

Complications
Not all sequelae of trauma are immediate and many of them can occur months or years after the initial incident thus required prolonged follow-up. Common complications are pulpal necrosis, pulpal obliteration, root resorption and damage to the successors teeth in primary teeth dental trauma. The most common complication was pulp necrosis (34.2%). 50% of the tooth that have trauma related to avulsion experienced ankylotic root resorption after a median TIC (time elapsed between the traumatic event and the diagnosis of complications) of 1.18 years. Teeth that have multiple traumatic events also showed to have higher chance of pulp necrosis (61.9%) compared to teeth that experienced a single traumatic injury (25.3%) in the studies (1)

Pulpal necrosis
Pulp necrosis usually occurs either as ischaemic necrosis (infarction) caused by disruption to the blood supply at the apical foramen or as an infection-related liquefactive necrosis following dental trauma (2). Signs of pulpal necrosis include
 Persistent grey colour to tooth that does not fade
 Radiographic signs of periapical inflammation
 Clinical signs of infection: tenderness, sinus, suppuration, swelling

Treatment options will be extraction for the primary tooth. For the permanent tooth, endodontic treatment can be considered.

Root resorption 

Root resorption following traumatic dental injuries, whether located along the root surface or within the root canal appears to be a sequel to wound healing events, where a significant amount of the PDL or pulp has been lost due to the effect of acute trauma.

Pulpal obliteration
4-24% of traumatized teeth will have some degrees of pulpal obliteration that is characterized by the loss of pulpal space radiographically and yellow discolouration of the clinical crown. 
No treatment is needed if it is asymptomatic. Treatment options will be extraction for symptomatic primary tooth. For symptomatic permanent tooth, root canal treatment is often challenging due to pulp chamber is filled with calcified material and the ‘drop off’ sensation of entering a pulp chamber will not occur.

Damage to the successor teeth
Dental trauma to the primary teeth might cause damage to the permanent teeth. Damage to the permanent teeth especially during development stage might have following consequences:
 Crown dilaceration
Odontoma-like malformation
 Sequestration of permanent tooth germs
 Root dilaceration
 Arrest of root formation

Epidemiology
Dental trauma is most common in younger people, accounting for 17% of injuries to the body in those aged 0–6 years compared to an average of 5% across all ages. It is more frequently observed in males compared to females. Traumatic dental injuries are more common in permanent teeth compared to deciduous teeth and usually involve the front teeth of the upper jaw.

"The oral region comprises 1% of the total body area, yet it accounts for 5% of all bodily injuries. In preschool children, oral injuries make up as much as 17% of all bodily injuries. The incidence of traumatic dental injuries is 1%–3%, and the prevalence is steady at 20%–30%.”

Almost 30% of the children in pre-school have mostly experienced trauma to primary teeth. Dental injuries involving the permanent teeth happen to almost 25% of children in school and 30% of adults. The incident varies in different countries as well as within the country itself. Dental traumatic accidents depends on one's activity status and also the surrounding environment factor but these are the main predisposing risk factor compared to a person's age and gender.

Trauma is the most common cause of loss of permanent incisors in childhood. Dental trauma often lead to the main complication such as pulpal necrosis, and it's nearly impossible to predict the long-term prognosis of the injured tooth and often results in long term restorative problems.

See also 

Dental barotrauma
Cracked tooth syndrome

References

External links 
Dental Trauma Guide, an interactive tool for evidence based dental trauma treatment
International Association Of Dental Traumatology

Acquired tooth disorders
Emergency medicine
Medical emergencies
Trauma types